The Central Band of the Royal Air Force is an RAF regular band and is part of Royal Air Force Music Services. The motto of the band is Aere Invicti (Latin for "Invincible with the Brass").

History
The Central Band of the RAF was formed in 1920, shortly after the RAF had been formed in 1918. Their version of the theme from the Dam Busters reached No. 18 in October 1955, spending one week in the UK Top 20.

The band has given performances on BBC Radio 2's Friday Night is Music Night in October 2010 and, to mark the 100th anniversary of the formation of the RAF, in April 2018.

Personnel

All band members are fully trained military personnel. 
The director of music is Flight Lieutenant Tom Rodda.
The bandmaster is Warrant Officer Tony Scannell.

Notable personnel
Henry Walford Davies, founder of the RAF Central Band
Ronnie Aldrich, British easy listening and jazz pianist
Malcolm Corden, father of comedian James Corden
Sid Colin, television and film screenwriter
Duncan Stubbs, RAF Music Services principal director of music

See also
 The Squadronaires - The RAF's 'Big Band' style group.

References

External links
 

Bands of the Royal Air Force
Musical groups established in 1920